Daniel Te'o-Nesheim (né Nesheim; June 12, 1987 – October 29, 2017) was a Samoan American football outside linebacker. He was drafted by the Philadelphia Eagles in the third round of the 2010 NFL Draft. He played college football at Washington.

Early years
Te'o-Nesheim was born in Pago Pago, American Samoa on June 12, 1987, to parents David and Ailota Nesheim. He moved to Mill Creek, Washington at the age of 5. His father, David, died of an aneurysm when Te'o-Nesheim was attending Heatherwood Middle School. Te'o-Nesheim relocated back to American Samoa at age 12 before going on to attend boarding school in Hawaii. Although his last name was originally Nesheim his mother suggested adding the Samoan surname Te'o to it while he was in high school as a tribute to the family's Samoan heritage.

Te'o-Nesheim was a three-time first-team all-league selection as two-way lineman during his high school years at Hawaii Preparatory Academy. He helped his team to an 11-1 overall record during his senior year, including a 10-0 league record, before losing in the state semi-finals. Playing on the first-team from the big island to win a state playoff game.  He also excelled in track, competing in the shot put and discus. Winning the state championship in shot put and second in discus his senior year.  Te'o-Nesheim also lettered in basketball and baseball. He was a high school teammate of center Max Unger.  He was coached by Bern Brostek (NFL center).

Te'o-Nesheim was recruited by Oregon, Hawaii and Washington, but committed to Washington a few days prior to signing day in 2005.

College career
Te'o-Nesheim played college football at the University of Washington. He redshirted in 2005 and earned the scout team defensive player of the year award. He was named the defensive MVP in 2007. In 2008, he won the Guy Flaherty Most Inspirational Award, the John P. Angel Defensive Lineman of the Year award, and the L. Wait Rising Lineman of the Year award. He was named a team captain in 2008 and 2009. He earned second-team All-Pac-10 honors in 2009.

He started all 49 games of his career recording a total of 194 tackles, 30 sacks, 50.5 tackles for loss, eight forced fumbles, and two fumble recoveries. His 30 sacks set a school record for career sacks, breaking the record set by Ron Holmes, who played from 1981 to 1984, with 28.

Professional career

Philadelphia Eagles
Te'o-Nesheim was selected by the Philadelphia Eagles in the third round (86th overall) of the 2010 NFL Draft. He was signed to a four-year contract on June 16, 2010. Te'o-Nesheim was hindered by a shoulder injury throughout his rookie season, only playing in six games (starting in the season-finale against Dallas after the Eagles clinched a playoff berth) and recording two tackles and one sack. He registered his first career sack in the game against the Cowboys.

Te'o-Nesheim was waived on September 3, 2011, during final roster cuts, but was re-signed to the team's practice squad on September 4.

Tampa Bay Buccaneers
After spending most of the 2011 season on the Eagles' practice squad, Te'o-Nesheim was signed off it by the Tampa Bay Buccaneers on November 22.

NFL statistics

Key
 GP: games played
 COMB: combined tackles
 TOTAL: total tackles
 AST: assisted tackles
 SACK: sacks
 FF: forced fumbles
 FR: fumble recoveries
 FR YDS: fumble return yards 
 INT: interceptions
 IR YDS: interception return yards
 AVG IR: average interception return
 LNG: longest interception return
 TD: interceptions returned for touchdown
 PD: passes defensed

Later life and death
Following his playing days, Te'o-Nesheim became an assistant coach for two years at his high school, Hawaii Preparatory Academy, before becoming the head coach in 2017. Te'o-Nesheim died at the age of 30 on October 29, 2017. He died after a night of drinking at a friend's house, with a mixture of pills and alcohol in his system, the local medical examiner told The Seattle Times. Te'o-Nesheim's family donated his brain to the Boston University School of Medicine, where doctors determined that he had been suffering from chronic traumatic encephalopathy.

See also
 Washington Huskies football statistical leaders

References

Further reading

External links
Philadelphia Eagles bio
Tampa Bay Buccaneers bio
Washington Huskies bio

1987 births
2017 deaths
American football players with chronic traumatic encephalopathy
American people of Norwegian descent
American sportspeople of Samoan descent
People from Hawaii (island)
Players of American football from Hawaii
American football defensive ends
Washington Huskies football players
Philadelphia Eagles players
Players of American football from American Samoa
Tampa Bay Buccaneers players
Orlando Predators players
People from Pago Pago
People from Mill Creek, Washington
Drug-related deaths in Hawaii
Alcohol-related deaths in Hawaii